Johann Adolf II, Duke of Saxe-Weissenfels (Weissenfels, 4 September 1685 – Leipzig, 16 May 1746), was the last duke of Saxe-Weissenfels-Querfurt and a member of the House of Wettin. He was also a commander in the Saxon army.

Johann Adolf was the youngest of the eleven children of Johann Adolf I, Duke of Saxe-Weissenfels, and Johanna Magdalena of Saxe-Altenburg. His mother died five months after his birth, on 22 January 1686.

Life

In the War of the Polish Succession, Johann Adolf led Saxon troops into Poland (October 1733). For the next three years, the Saxon army remained mainly in southern Poland, until the coronation of the Elector Frederick August II of Saxony as King of Poland after the defeat of Stanisław Leszczyński, the rival candidate for the Polish throne. That same year, Johann Adolf inherited Saxe-Weissenfels when his brother Christian died without children.

During the Second Silesian War, Prussian troops crossed the Saxon border, and Saxony and Austria agreed to proceed together against Prussia. Saxon troops planned to cut off the Prussians in northern Silesia, while Austrian troops would advance from the south. But in June 1745, they were defeated at the Battle of Hohenfriedberg. Johann Adolf planned a new offensive campaign in September 1745, but he changed his mind two weeks later. Because of this, he was replaced as commander-in-chief by Count Frederick August Rutowski, an illegitimate half-brother of the King-Elector.

After the Battle of Kesselsdorf, the Elector removed his half-brother Rutowski as commander-in-chief and reinstated Johann Adolf, who began his duties as commander on 1 December 1745. Additionally, he was appointed chief of the Saxon government during the absence of the Elector and the Minister Heinrich of Brühl.

Johann Adolf retreated with the Saxon troops to Bohemia. Five months later, he suffered a heart attack and died at age sixty-one.

Marriages and Issue

In Eisenach on 9 May 1721, Johann Adolf married Johannette Antoinette Juliane of Saxe-Eisenach. They had one son:

Frederick Johann Adolf (b. Dahme, 26 May 1722 – d. Dahme, 10 July 1724).

In Altenburg on 27 November 1734, Johann Adolf married for a second time to Fredericka of Saxe-Gotha-Altenburg. They had five children:

Karl Frederick Adolf, Hereditary Prince of Saxe-Weissenfels (b. Weissenfels, 7 June 1736 – d. Weissenfels, 24 March 1737).
Johann Adolf, Hereditary Prince of Saxe-Weissenfels (b. Weissenfels, 27 June 1738 – d. Weissenfels, 21 October 1738).
August Adolf, Hereditary Prince of Saxe-Weissenfels (b. Weissenfels, 6 June 1739 – d. Weissenfels, 7 June 1740).
Johann Georg Adolf, Hereditary Prince of Saxe-Weissenfels (b. Weissenfels, 17 May 1740 – d. Weissenfels, 10 July 1740).
Fredericka Adolfine (b. Weissenfels, 27 December 1741 – d. Langensalza, 4 July 1751).

He was the last member of the line of Saxe-Weissenfels-Querfurt. After his death without surviving male issue, his lands passed to the Electorate of Saxony, from which they had been extracted in 1657 under the terms of the will of John George I, Elector of Saxony.

1685 births
1746 deaths
House of Saxe-Weissenfels
People from Weißenfels
Field marshals of Saxony
Weissenfels,Johann Adolf II, Duke of Saxe
Weissenfels,Johann Adolf II, Duke of Saxe
Dukes of Saxe-Weissenfels
Knights of the Garter
Generals of the Holy Roman Empire
People of the Silesian Wars
Albertine branch
Recipients of the Order of the White Eagle (Poland)
Military personnel from Saxony-Anhalt